FM/TV Mast Giżycko/Miłki (Polish: RTCN Giżycko/Miłki) is a -high guyed mast located at Miłki near Giżycko, Warmian-Masurian Voivodeship in Poland, built in 1998. It was raised on the hill near the Wojnowo lake and is the 9th highest mast in Poland and the 2nd highest in the Warmian-Masurian Voivodeship.

Transmitted programmes

Digital television MPEG-4

FM radio

See also
 List of masts

References

External links
 http://emi.emitel.pl/EMITEL/obiekty.aspx?obiekt=DODR_N2K
 http://radiopolska.pl/wykaz/pokaz_lokalizacja.php?pid=84
 http://www.przelaczenie.eu/mapy/warminskomazurskie
 http://www.dvbtmap.eu/mapcoverage.html?chid=8140

Giżycko County
Radio masts and towers in Poland
Towers completed in 1998